The second series of Handmade: Britain's Best Woodworker started on 21 September 2022 and aired for eight episodes concluding on 9 November 2022. The series was hosted by Mel Giedroyc and there were two new judges, Tom Dyckhoff and Sophie Sellu. Filming took place at the Glanusk Estate in the Brecon Beacons National Park.

Woodworkers

Results and eliminations

Colour key:

 Woodworker got through to the next round.
 Woodworker was eliminated.
 Woodworker did not participate.
 Woodworker won immunity from elimination.
 Woodworker of the week.
 Woodworker won both immunity from elimination and woodworker of the week.
 Woodworker was a series runner-up.
 Woodworker was the series winner.

Episodes

 Woodworker eliminated  
 Woodworker of the week 
 Woodworker won immunity 
 Winner

Episode 1

The Big Build was to make a six place dining table, inspired by a country. The Bespoke Brief was to do cut a design into a veneer, which was then fitted to a lightbox.

Episode 2

The woodworkers were asked to make a wooden decorative clock, inspired by a time in their life.  From this episode, woodworker Calum did not continue in the series, with his place being taken by Ashley.

Episode 3

The woodworkers were asked to make a wooden decorative clock, inspired by a time in their life.

Episode 4

Seven remaining woodworkers must create a bespoke day bed inspired by an art or design movement, and master the decorative art of pyrography by scorching a portrait of Mel Giedroyc onto wood.

Episode 5

The remaining six woodworkers face their biggest build yet as they create a sea-inspired sculpture from a fallen tree trunk.

Episode 6

For the week's Big Build challenge, the five remaining woodworkers must create a stylish rocking chair with a modern twist. Everyone's keen to secure immunity by building the best bird box.

Episode 7: Semi-Final

Mel Giedroyc tasks the four remaining woodworkers to carve a bespoke desk and wooden vase for a place in the final. But who will have a good day at the office and who will be told to work from home?

Episode 8: Final

The three remaining woodworkers must create a home bar. It has to be dramatic, sophisticated and at least one-metre tall. Then they must design & carve out a sympathetic bar sign.

References

2022 British television seasons
Handmade: Britain's Best Woodworker